Emma E. Booker Elementary School is a public elementary school in Sarasota, Florida, which opened in the fall of 1989. It is one of the Booker Schools, with a middle and high school of the same name nearby.  It is a part of Sarasota County Schools. On September 11, 2001, the school received international attention because United States President George W. Bush was visiting when he learned of the terrorist attacks that were unfolding that day.

The Booker Schools
The Booker Schools were named for Emma E. Booker, an African-American educator who began teaching at Sarasota County's first black school, Sarasota Grammar School, in 1918. Around that time, Ms. Booker began to take college classes during the summer school break. By 1923, she had become principal of the school, which had no physical building and used rented halls for classes. Her students "sat at desks made of orange crates, learning from hand-me-down books discarded from the white schools."

Julius Rosenwald, a part-owner of Sears, established the Rosenwald Fund in 1917 to help underfunded African-American schools in the South. Within the first few years of its establishment, the Fund provided the means for the first African-American school in Sarasota, located on 7th Street and Lemon Avenue, as Emma Booker had made the plight of the school known. The school (with four classrooms and an auditorium) opened with eight grades during the 1924-25 school year. On opening day, Emma Booker led her teachers and students from the Knights of Pythias rental hall to the new school. After 20 years of summer college attendance, she attained her bachelor's degree in 1937.

The Booker Schools were named in her honor in the late 1930s and were expanded to include a high school. When Emma E. Booker Elementary School was named in her honor, the paper said:
"Emma Booker perservered, personally encouraging students, underwriting their continued education and pressuring intransigent administrators to provide for blacks the same educational opportunities available to whites."

From 1939 to 1989, the Booker Schools all shared a campus at Myrtle Street and Orange Avenue in Sarasota. In 1966, 12 years after the U.S. Supreme Court case Brown vs. Board of Education ended school segregation, there were only 36 African-American students enrolled in the all-white high schools. In 1967, the Sarasota County School Board shut down Booker High School, resulting in the students there having to attend the all-white Sarasota High School. The Newtown community protested the Booker school closure by boycotting the public schools and sending their children to "freedom schools" at local churches. Booker High School reopened in 1970 and became a Visual and Performing Arts magnet school shortly thereafter. The combined Booker School campus was split into the Emma E. Booker Elementary School in 1989 and to the Booker Middle School in 2003, with the Booker High School being refurbished at the previous location.

2001 visit from President Bush

The school received international attention following a visit by United States President George W. Bush on the morning of September 11, 2001. He visited the school as part of an effort to promote his administration's education policy, particularly the No Child Left Behind Act. It was at the school that Bush learned of the second plane crashing into the World Trade Center, and where he made his first public comments about the September 11 attacks.

Report of attacks

The first plane crash at the World Trade Center happened about ten minutes before the president arrived at the school. A press pool photographer heard a radio message that White House Press Secretary Ari Fleischer would be needed to answer questions about a "crash" and that there was a call on hold from Condoleezza Rice. Bush entered the second-grade classroom of Sandra Kay Daniels where he introduced the class to Education Secretary Rod Paige and shook hands with Mrs. Daniels. He and the teacher then sat down facing the seated students to read the children's story, The Pet Goat.

At about 9:05 a.m. White House Chief of Staff Andrew Card whispered into Bush's ear, "A second plane has hit the second tower. America is under attack." Bush appeared tense but remained seated for roughly seven minutes and continued to listen while the children read in unison through the story, sometimes repeating lines to meet Mrs. Daniels's standards. The reading concluded with the phrase "more to come" and Bush asked the class, "What does that mean - 'more to come'?"  After a student replied, he praised the students' reading skills and encouraged them to continue practicing, before he excused himself and left the room.

According to Bill Sammon in Fighting Back: The War on Terrorism from Inside the White House, Ari Fleischer was in the back of the classroom holding a pad on which he had written, "Don't say anything yet." Sammon contends that, although Bush was not wearing his glasses, he was able to read this message, and it went unnoticed by the media. Sammon further stated:

Bush wondered whether he should excuse himself and retreat to the holding room, where he might be able to find out what the hell was going on. But what kind of message would that send—the president abruptly getting up and walking out on a bunch of inner-city second-graders at their moment in the national limelight?

Press conference

Bush was scheduled for a short press conference in the school library after spending about 20 minutes total in the classroom. This was delayed by several minutes. When Bush appeared, he announced, "This is a difficult moment for America," and instead of the planned topic, addressed the country for several minutes about the plane crashes and the government's immediate response. He then left the school for Sarasota-Bradenton International Airport.

Aftermath

Bush's critics, notably Michael Moore in his film Fahrenheit 9/11, have argued that the fact that Bush continued reading the book after being notified that the attack was ongoing shows that he was indecisive. A 9/11 Commission Staff Report entitled Improvising a Homeland Defense said: "The President felt he should project strength and calm until he could better understand what was happening."

A week later, Bush wrote to the school's principal, apologizing for not being able to stay longer.

Osama bin Laden made reference to the story in an unauthenticated videotaped speech released just prior to the 2004 U.S. presidential election, stating that Bush's reading of the book had given the hijackers more than enough time to carry out the attacks. His full quote was:

But because it seemed to him that occupying himself by talking to the little girl about the goat and its butting was more important than occupying himself with the planes and their butting of the skyscrapers, we were given three times the period required to execute the operations - all praise is due to Allah.

In the years following the incident, faculty and students of the school have come to the defense of Bush's actions. Principal Gwendolyn Tose-Rigell, who died in 2007, stated, "I don't think anyone could have handled it better. What would it have served if [Bush] had jumped out of his chair and ran out of the room?"

Asked about the incident for Time shortly after bin Laden's death in 2011, two of the students from the classroom, Lazaro Dubrocq and Mariah Williams, credited Bush with keeping the classroom calm by finishing the story. "I don't remember the story we were reading — was it about pigs?" said Williams, then 16. "But I'll always remember watching his face turn red. He got really serious all of a sudden. But I was clueless. I was just seven. I'm just glad he didn't get up and leave because then I would have been more scared and confused." Chantal Guerrero, then 16, agreed; even today she's grateful that Bush regained his composure and stayed with the students until The Pet Goat was finished. "I think the President was trying to keep us from finding out," said Guerrero, "so we all wouldn't freak out."

References

External links
 

Public elementary schools in Florida
Buildings and structures in Sarasota, Florida
September 11 attacks
Educational institutions established in 1989
1989 establishments in Florida
Articles containing video clips